Ferlin is both a given name and a surname.

Notable people with the given name include:
Ferlin Husky (1925–2011), American singer 
Ferlin C. A. Sangma, Indian politician

Notable people with the surname include:
Brian Ferlin (born 1992), American ice hockey player
Klemen Ferlin (born 1989), Slovenian handball player 
Nils Ferlin (1898–1961), Swedish poet and lyricist